English Rugby Union Midland Division - Midlands 2 West is an English Rugby Union League.

Midlands 2 West is made up of teams from around the Midlands of England who play home and away matches throughout a winter season.

Promoted teams move up to Midlands 1.

Teams 2008-2009

Bromsgrove
Burton
Camp Hill 
Cheltenham North
Dudley Kingswinford  
Hereford  
Solihull
Stoke
Stratford Upon Avon
Sutton Coldfield
Walsall
Whitchurch

References

 Rugby First: To view previous seasons in the league, search for any club within that league then click on to club details followed by fixtures and then select the appropriate season.

See also

 English rugby union system

3